The township of Oturehua is in the Ida Valley of the Maniototo, in Central Otago, in the South Island of New Zealand.

The settlement stands at 500 metres above sea level, some 25 kilometres from Ranfurly, to which it is connected by both road and the Otago Central Rail Trail long-distance walking track. The population was 112 residents at last count.

The New Zealand Ministry for Culture and Heritage gives a translation of "place where the summer star stands still" for Ōturēhua.

History

Oturehua lies beneath a Rough Ridge, a range of hills. The township was also called Rough Ridge until 1907.

The area has changed little from its description in 1905 when it was described as good arable land, from which large crops are successfully raised.

In 1905, the township comprised a post and telegraph office, a store, a hotel near the railway station, a school, coal pits and a flour mill. Of these, only the Gilchrist's General Store and the Oturehua Tavern remain.

Features

Hayes Engineering, located immediately southwest of the township, was once the home to Ernest Hayes, a farmer and flour miller who began producing and selling farm tools from his Oturehua property. Hayes invented the internationally acclaimed wire strainer, as well as pulley blocks, cattle stops and windmills.

The Idaburn Dam, located 3 km southwest of Oturehua along the Ida Valley Omakau Road is used for curling bonspiels when conditions permit. It is also the site of the annual mid-winter Brass Monkey Motorcycle Rally.

The Otago Central Rail Trail runs through Oturehua, adjacent the Ida Valley Omakau Road. The settlement has a number accommodation options.

The remnants of the Golden Progress quartz mine are located 2 km east of Oturehua on Rough Ridge. These workings are notable as they still retain an intact poppet head, the only surviving one in the Otago goldfields. The Golden Progress poppet head was constructed of Australian hardwood and erected later than most, in 1928, which explains its survival. The mine was worked by three lignite-fired boilers, two for the poppet head to drive the winding gear and one to drive the battery further down the gully.

Education

Notes

Central Otago District
Populated places in Otago